Anderson is a lunar impact crater that is located on the far side of the Moon. It is located to the northwest of the crater Sharonov, and the satellite crater Sharanov X is attached to the southeast rim of Anderson. To the northeast is the peculiar formation Buys-Ballot, and to the east-southeast lies the larger crater Spencer Jones.

The outer rim of Anderson is heavily worn and eroded. Small craters overlie the southeastern and southwestern rims. The interior is relatively flat, with multiple tiny craters covering parts of the floor. The most prominent of these is Anderson L, located near the southeastern rim.  Anderson L is also commonly known as the Anderson Finger.

The crater lies within the Freundlich-Sharonov Basin.

Satellite craters
By convention these features are identified on lunar maps by placing the letter on the side of the crater midpoint that is closest to Anderson.

References

External links
 

Impact craters on the Moon